James Murray, 2nd Duke of Atholl,  (28 September 16908 January 1764), styled Marquess of Tullibardine between 1715 and 1746, was a Scottish peer, and Lord Privy Seal.

Life
Atholl was born in Edinburgh, Scotland and was the third son of John Murray, 1st Duke of Atholl and Lady Katherine Hamilton.

In 1712, he was made captain of the grenadier company of the 1st Foot Guards. On the attainder in 1715 of his elder brother, William Murray, Marquess of Tullibardine, for taking part in the Jacobite rising, an act was passed by parliament vesting the family honours and estates in him as the next heir. After the conclusion of the rebellion, he appears to have gone to Edinburgh to represent in as favourable a light as possible to the government the services of his father, in order to procure for him a sum of money in name of compensation.

At the election of 1715, he was chosen M.P. for Perth, and he was re-elected in 1722. He succeeded to the peerage on the death of his father in 1724; and in 1733 an act of parliament was passed to explain and extend the act of 1715, by providing that the attainder of William, marquis of Tullibardine, should not extend to prevent any descent of honour and estate to James, duke of Atholl, and his issue, or to any of the issue or heirs male of John, late duke of Atholl, other than the said William Murray and his issue. 

In June 1724, he was made Lord Privy Seal, succeeding Lord Ilay, and on 21 September, he was chosen a representative peer. He was re-elected in 1734, and during the same year was invested with the Order of the Thistle. As maternal grandson of James Stanley, 7th Earl of Derby, Atholl succeeded to the sovereignty of the Isle of Man, and to the ancient barony of Strange, of Knockyn, Wotton, Mohun, Burnel, Basset, and Lacy, on the death of James, 10th Earl of Derby, in 1736.

From 1737 to the general election of 1741, he sat in parliament both as an English baron and as a Scottish representative peer. On the approach of the highland army after the Jacobite rising of 1745, Atholl fled southwards, and his elder brother, the Marquis of Tullibardine, took possession of Blair Castle. Atholl, however, joined the army of the Duke of Cumberland in England, and, arriving with him in Edinburgh on 30 January 1746, went northwards. On 9 February, he sent a summons to his vassals to attend at Dunkeld and Kirkmichael and join the king's troops. On 6 April 1763, Atholl resigned the office of privy seal on being appointed keeper of the great seal in succession to Charles Douglas (1698–1778), Duke of Queensberry and Dover. He was also at the same time made lord justice general. 

He was allegedly the first to plant European Larch in Great Britain; one of a group of five near Dunkeld cathedral planted in 1738 is still alive

He died at Dunkeld on 8 January 1764, in his seventy-fourth year, and was buried at Inveresk.

He was succeeded by in the barony of Strange by his daughter, Lady Charlotte, and in the Scottish titles by his nephew, John, the son of George Murray, a general in the Jacobite rising of 1745 which the second Duke did not join.

Family
Atholl married firstly Jane, daughter of Thomas Frederick (son of Sir John Frederick, Lord Mayor of London), on 28 April 1726. They had four children:
John Murray, Marquess of Tullibardine (1728–1729), died in infancy.
Lady Jane Murray (c. 1730–1747)
Lady Charlotte Murray (1731–1805)
James Murray, Marquess of Tullibardine (1735–1736), died in infancy.

After his first wife's death in 1748 he married secondly Jean, daughter of John Drummond, 10th of Lennoch, on 7 May 1749, in Edinburgh. There were no children from this marriage.

References

Attribution

External links

 

1690 births
1764 deaths
Politicians from Edinburgh
102
Murray, James
Knights of the Thistle
Murray, James
Members of the Privy Council of Great Britain
Murray, James
James
Governors of the Isle of Man
Burials in Scotland
17th-century Scottish people
18th-century Scottish people
Grenadier Guards officers
Dukes of Rannoch
Freemasons of the Premier Grand Lodge of England
Monarchs of the Isle of Man
Barons Strange
British Army personnel of the Jacobite rising of 1745